Pyaar Karke Dekho (transl. Look At Me Lovingly)  is a 1987 Indian film. It was one of the first movies to feature Govinda and Kader Khan, who went on to star in a number of movies later. Another cast includes Mandakini, Aruna Irani, Nirupa Roy and Om Shivpuri. The movie was Kannada film industry's well known director D. Rajendra Babu's debut Hindi movie. It was a remake of his own 1985 Kannada movie Naanu Nanna Hendthi. 
The movie failed and declared "flop" at box office India.

Cast
Govinda as Ravi Kumar
Mandakini as Urvashi
Kader Khan as Sampat Shrivastav
Aruna Irani as Mrs. Sampat Shrivastav 
Nirupa Roy as Leelavati
Om Shivpuri as Thakur
Vikas Anand as All India Talent Association's Director

Soundtrack
Lyrics: Indeevar

See also
 Chandulal Jain - Executive Producer

References

External links
 

1980s Hindi-language films
1987 films
Films scored by Bappi Lahiri
Hindi remakes of Kannada films
Films directed by D. Rajendra Babu